The following lists events that happened during 1909 in New Zealand.

Incumbents

Regal and viceregal
Head of State – Edward VII
Governor – The Lord Plunket GCMG KCVO

Government
The 11th New Zealand Parliament commenced.
Speaker of the House – Sir Arthur Guinness
Prime Minister – Joseph Ward
Minister of Finance – Joseph Ward
Attorney-General – John Findlay
Chief Justice – Sir Robert Stout

Parliamentary opposition
Leader of the Opposition – William Massey (independent until February and thereafter as leader of the Reform Party)

Main centre leaders
Mayor of Auckland – Arthur Myers then Charles Grey
Mayor of Wellington – Alfred Newman
Mayor of Christchurch – Charles Allison
Mayor of Dunedin – John McDonald then James Walker

Events 
 1 January: The Quackery Prevention Act 1908 becomes law, preventing false advertising in relation to ingredients, composition, structure, nature or operation of a medicine.
 12 February: Inter-island steamer SS Penguin is wrecked at Cape Terawhiti in Cook Strait with the loss of 75 lives.
14 February: The first North Island Main Trunk passenger express train leaves Auckland for Wellington, an overnight trip scheduled to take 19 hours 15 minutes, with a sleeping car, day cars with reclining seats, postal/parcels vans, and a dining car for part of the way.

Undated
 The Canterbury (NZ) Aero Club, the first in New Zealand, is formed by George Bolt.

Arts and literature

See 1909 in art, 1909 in literature

Music

See: 1909 in music

Film

See:  1909 in film, List of New Zealand feature films, Cinema of New Zealand, :Category:1909 films

Sport

Boxing
National amateur champions
Heavyweight – M. Ryan (Invercargill)
Middleweight – S. Monaghan (Ohakune)
Welterweight – G. Watchorn (Palmerston North)
Lightweight – J. Finnerty (Invercargill)
Featherweight – J. Hagerty (Timaru)
Bantamweight – C. Stewart (Timaru)

Cricket

Chess
 The 22nd National Chess Championship was held in Dunedin, and was won by F.K. Kelling of Wellington.

Golf
 The third New Zealand Open championship was won by J.A. Clements (his second consecutive win).
 The 17th National Amateur Championships were held in Auckland
 Men: Arthur Duncan (Wellington) – 6th title
 Women: Mrs ? Bevan.

Horse racing

Harness racing
 New Zealand Trotting Cup: Wildwood Junior
 Auckland Trotting Cup: Havoc

Rugby league
New Zealand national rugby league team

Rugby union
 Auckland defend the Ranfurly Shield only once, beating Taranaki 18-5

Soccer
Provincial league champions:
	Auckland:	Auckland Corinthians
	Canterbury:	Burnham Industrial School
	Otago:	Dunedin City
	Southland:	Murihiku
	Taranaki:	Kaponga
	Wellington:	Wellington Swifts

Tennis
Anthony Wilding and Australian Norman Brookes, as the Australasian team, successfully defend the Davis Cup, beating the United States 5–0. The final is held in Sydney.
Anthony Wilding wins the men's singles at the Australian Open.

Births
 15 April: Jack Watts, politician.
 18 April: Tom Skinner, politician, Federation of Labour president.
 20 May: Bill Pratney, cyclist.
 13 June: Ralph Hanan, politician.
 27 July: Charles Brasch, poet and literary editor.
 20 August: Alby Roberts, cricketer.
 15 September: Jean Batten, aviator.
 16 September: Rod MacKenzie, rugby union player 
 31 October: Frank Bateson, astronomer.
 23 December: Don Cleverley, cricketer.

Deaths
 14 February: Elsie Dohrmann, scholar, teacher and temperance campaigner
 28 April: John Wilson (businessman), businessman and judge
 7 August: Arthur Remington, politician
 14 August: Samuel Brown, Mayor of Wellington.
 Maria Sophia Pope, shopkeeper and businesswoman.

See also
History of New Zealand
List of years in New Zealand
Military history of New Zealand
Timeline of New Zealand history
Timeline of New Zealand's links with Antarctica
Timeline of the New Zealand environment

References

External links